5,6-Dihydro-5(α-thyminyl)thymine is a DNA pyrimidine dimer photoproduct produced when DNA in bacterial spores is exposed to ultraviolet light.  In bacteria, this DNA base dimer deforms the structure of DNA, so endospore forming bacteria have an enzyme called spore photoproduct lyase that repairs this damage.

Laboratory synthesis
5,6-Dihydro-5(α-thyminyl)thymine can also be synthesized in a laboratory by reacting 5-hydroxymethyluracil and 6-aminothymine yielding 5,6-dihydro-6-imino-5-(α-thyminyl)thymine. When hydrogen is added in a reduction then 5,6-dihydro-5(α-thyminyl)thymine is the product.

References

Pyrimidinediones
Dimers (chemistry)